The Apiales are an order of flowering plants. The families are those recognized in the APG III system. This is typical of the newer classifications, though there is some slight variation and in particular, the Torriceliaceae may be divided. Under this definition, well-known members include carrots, celery, and parsley. The order Apiales is placed within the asterid group of eudicots as circumscribed by the APG III system. Within the asterids, Apiales belongs to an unranked group called the campanulids, and within the campanulids, it belongs to a clade known in phylogenetic nomenclature as Apiidae. In 2010, a subclade of Apiidae named Dipsapiidae was defined to consist of the three orders: Apiales, Paracryphiales, and Dipsacales.

The anthophytes are a grouping of plant taxa bearing flower-like reproductive structures. They were formerly thought to be a clade comprising plants bearing flower-like structures.  The group contained the angiosperms - the extant flowering plants, such as roses and grasses - as well as the Gnetales and the extinct Bennettitales.

23,420 species of vascular plant have been recorded in South Africa, making it the sixth most species-rich country in the world and the most species-rich country on the African continent. Of these, 153 species are considered to be threatened. Nine biomes have been described in South Africa: Fynbos, Succulent Karoo, desert, Nama Karoo, grassland, savanna, Albany thickets, the Indian Ocean coastal belt, and forests.

The 2018 South African National Biodiversity Institute's National Biodiversity Assessment plant checklist lists 35,130 taxa in the phyla Anthocerotophyta (hornworts (6)), Anthophyta (flowering plants (33534)), Bryophyta (mosses (685)), Cycadophyta (cycads (42)), Lycopodiophyta (Lycophytes(45)), Marchantiophyta (liverworts (376)), Pinophyta (conifers (33)), and Pteridophyta (cryptogams (408)).

Three families are represented in the literature. Listed taxa include species, subspecies, varieties, and forms as recorded, some of which have subsequently been allocated to other taxa as synonyms, in which cases the accepted taxon is appended to the listing. Multiple entries under alternative names reflect taxonomic revision over time.

Apiaceae

Family: Apiaceae, 65 genera have been recorded. Not all are necessarily currently accepted. 

 Genus Aethusa:
 Genus Afroligusticum:
 Genus Afrosciadium:
 Genus Agrocharis:
 Genus Alepidea:
 Genus Ammi:
 Genus Anginon:
 Genus Annesorhiza:
 Genus Anthriscus:
 Genus Apium:
 Genus Arctopus:
 Genus Berula:
 Genus Bupleurum:
 Genus Buprestis:
 Genus Capnophyllum:
 Genus Carum:
 Genus Caucalis:
 Genus Celeri:
 Genus Centella:
 Genus Chamarea:
 Genus Choritaenia:
 Genus Conium:
 Genus Coriandrum:
 Genus Cyclospermum:
 Genus Cynorhiza:
 Genus Dasispermum:
 Genus Daucus:
 Genus Deverra:
 Genus Diplolophium:
 Genus Dracosciadium:
 Genus Dregea:
 Genus Ezosciadium:
 Genus Ferula:
 Genus Foeniculum:
 Genus Glia:
 Genus Helodium:
 Genus Helosciadium:
 Genus Hermas:
 Genus Heteromorpha:
 Genus Ifdregea:
 Genus Itasina:
 Genus Lefebvrea:
 Genus Lichtensteinia:
 Genus Meum:
 Genus Nanobubon:
 Genus Oreoselinum:
 Genus Pastinaca:
 Genus Perfoliata:
 Genus Petroselinum:
 Genus Peucedanum:
 Genus Pimpinella:
 Genus Polemannia:
 Genus Polemanniopsis:
 Genus Ptychotis:
 Genus Sanicula:
 Genus Scaraboides:
 Genus Seseli:
 Genus Sison:
 Genus Sium:
 Genus Sonderina:
 Genus Steganotaenia:
 Genus Stenosemis:
 Genus Stoibrax:
 Genus Torilis:
 Genus Turgenia:

Araliaceae
Family: Araliaceae,

Aralia
Genus Aralia:
 Aralia spinosa L. not indigenous, cultivated

Cussonia
Genus Cussonia:
 Cussonia arenicola Strey, indigenous
 Cussonia gamtoosensis Strey, endemic
 Cussonia natalensis Sond. indigenous
 Cussonia nicholsonii Strey, endemic
 Cussonia paniculata Eckl. & Zeyh. indigenous
 Cussonia paniculata Eckl. & Zeyh. subsp. paniculata, endemic
 Cussonia paniculata Eckl. & Zeyh. subsp. sinuata (Reyneke & Kok) De Winter, indigenous
 Cussonia sphaerocephala Strey, indigenous
 Cussonia spicata Thunb. indigenous
 Cussonia thyrsiflora Thunb. endemic
 Cussonia transvaalensis Reyneke, endemic
 Cussonia zuluensis Strey, indigenous

Dizygotheca
Genus Dizygotheca:
 Dizygotheca elegantissima (Veitch ex Mast.) R.Vig. & Guill. accepted as Schefflera elegantissima (Veitch ex Mast.) Lowry & Frodin, not indigenous

Hedera
Genus Hedera:
 Hedera canariensis Willd. not indigenous, cultivated
 Hedera helix L. not indigenous, invasive

Trichoneura
Genus Trichoneura:
 Trichoneura bonariensis Lam. indigenous
 Hydrocotyle inundata (L.) Sm.  accepted as Helosciadium inundatum (L.) W.D.J.Koch	
 Hydrocotyle schlechteri H.Wolff, endemic
 Hydrocotyle sibthorpioides Lam. indigenous
 Hydrocotyle verticillata Thunb. indigenous

Schefflera
Genus Schefflera:
 Schefflera actinophylla (Endl.) Harms, not indigenous, invasive
 Schefflera arboricola (Hayata) Merr. not indigenous, invasive
 Schefflera elegantissima (Veitch ex Mast.) Lowry & Frodin, not indigenous, invasive
 Schefflera umbellifera (Sond.) Baill. indigenous

Seemannaralia
Genus Seemannaralia:
 Seemannaralia gerrardii (Seem.) Harms, endemic

Pittosporaceae
Family: Pittosporaceae,

Billardiera
Genus Billardiera:
Billardiera heterophylla Lindl. not indigenous, invasive

Hymenosporum
Genus Hymenosporum:
Hymenosporum flavum (Hook.) R.Br. ex F.Muell. not indigenous

Pittosporum
Genus Pittosporum:
Pittosporum crassifolium Banks & Sol. ex A.Cunn. not indigenous, invasive
Pittosporum undulatum Vent. not indigenous, invasive
Pittosporum viridiflorum Sims, indigenous

References

South African plant biodiversity lists
Apiales